Göylərdağ (also, Göylər Dağ, Geoglyar, Geoglyar-Dag, and Gëylyar Dag) is a village in the Shamakhi Rayon of Azerbaijan.  The village forms part of the municipality of Göylər.

References 

Populated places in Shamakhi District